The Fiorucci Trophy was an invitational football tournament held at White Hart Lane, London. The only edition took place on 27 April 1993. It was a triangular round robin format contested by teams from Italy, Spain, and host nation England.

Tournament 
Source:

Each match lasted 45 minutes each. Drawn matches were resolved by extra-time and then penalties.

Results

Final Standings

References

External links 

English football friendly trophies
Defunct football cup competitions in England
International club association football competitions hosted by London
Sport in the London Borough of Haringey

1992–93 in English football
1992–93 in Italian football
1992–93 in Spanish football

1993 establishments in England
Tottenham Hotspur F.C.